William McKinney (born 20 July 1936) is an English former professional footballer who played in the Football League for Bournemouth & Boscombe Athletic, Mansfield Town and Newcastle United.

Right back who served his apprenticeship as a plater at Swan Hunter Shipyard, playing junior football for both Wallsend Rising Sun and Wallsend St. Lukes.

Called up for national service in the army, Bill was selected for their national XI and after returning to Tyneside joined United.

Losing out to fellow new arrival Dick Keith in his first season at Gallowgate, Bill had to wait until December 1957 for his first team chance, in a 3-3 draw away to Spurs.

Finally becoming a first team regular in the relegation season of 1960/61, McKinney stayed in and around the first team for the following three seasons as unsuccessful promotion challenges were mounted.

Replaced by David Craig in the closing weeks of the 1963/64 season, Bill featured just twice the following season before joining Bournemouth at a cost of £2,750 in August 1965, by then struggling with a nagging Achilles injury.

Bill moved again a year later to fellow Third Division side Mansfield Town and played on at Field Mill for another two seasons.

Joining Southern Premier League side Wellington Town (who later renamed themselves Telford United), McKinney settled in the Shropshire town of Dawley and remained there after his retirement.

References

1936 births
Living people
English footballers
Association football defenders
English Football League players
Newcastle United F.C. players
AFC Bournemouth players
Mansfield Town F.C. players
Telford United F.C. players